Leo Smith may refer to:

Leo Smith (baseball) (1859–1935), American baseball player
Leo Smith (composer) (1881–1952), English composer active in Canada
Leo Smith (sculptor) (born 1947), American sculptor
Leo Richard Smith (1905–1963), American prelate of the Roman Catholic Church
Wadada Leo Smith (born 1941), American avant-garde jazz trumpeter and composer
Leo Smith (hurler), Irish hurler

See also
Leo Smit (disambiguation)